The 2019 European Rowing Junior Championships took place in Essen, Germany, between 18 and 19 May 2019.

Medal summary

Men

Women

Medal table

References

External links
Official website 
Results

European Rowing Junior Championships
2019 European Rowing Junior Championships
European Rowing Junior Championships
Junior European Rowing
European Rowing Junior Championships